Intsia bijuga, commonly known as Borneo teak, Johnstone River teak, Kwila, Moluccan ironwood, Pacific teak, scrub mahogany and vesi, is a species of flowering tree in the family Fabaceae, native to the Indo-Pacific. It ranges from Tanzania and Madagascar east through India and Queensland, Australia, Papua New Guinea to the Pacific islands of Fiji and Samoa.It grows to around 50 metres (160 feet) tall with a highly buttressed trunk. It inhabits mangrove forests. Intsia bijuga differ from Intsia palembanica in the number of leaflets that make up their compound leaves.

The tree has a variety of common names including ipil and kwila.

Uses
The bark and leaves of the ipil are used in traditional medicines. The tree's timber, called kwila, is a very durable and termite-resistant wood, making it a highly valued material for flooring and other uses. The wood can also be used to extract a dye. The tree can contain a "gold" fleck that runs through the grain, considered to be attractive by some.
Due to extensive logging of the tree, it is endangered in many places in Southeast Asia, and almost extinct in some. Extensive amounts were purchased for the venue of the 2008 Summer Olympics in China, which is the largest importer of the wood. The wood is used for flooring in U.S. and European markets where it is commonly sold under different names. Both licensed and unlicensed mills harvest the wood.

Illegal logging
According to Greenpeace large amounts of ipil timber sourced from illegal logging is being imported into China where there are lax import rules. Greenpeace are targeting users in Western countries in order to halt the trade in ipil wood. Greenpeace claims that at the current rate of logging the tree will be wiped out within 35 years.

In New Zealand, where the ipil wood is known as kwila, attempts have been made to stop it from being imported. In 2008 retailers were divided in whether the sale of kwila should be banned. Jim Anderton, who was the Minister in charge of the Ministry of Agriculture and Forestry at that time, did not support a ban and instead he left it up to consumer choice.

Symbolism
Intsia bijuga, locally known as ifit, is the official tree of the United States territory of Guam. No longer abundant since World War II, it is illegal on Guam to cut live ifit trees. It remains the most popular wood for local carvers.

References

Further reading

External links

CIRAD Forestry Department — timber data

bijuga
Trees of Africa
Flora of tropical Asia
Trees of the Pacific
Trees of Madagascar
Trees of Seychelles
Trees of Taiwan
Flora of the Zanzibar Archipelago
Fabales of Australia
Trees of Australia
Flora of Queensland
Vulnerable biota of Queensland
Vulnerable flora of Australia
Vulnerable flora of Asia
Plants described in 1891